The Food Processing Technology Building is a Georgia Institute of Technology and Georgia Tech Research Institute facility. It houses the Food Processing Technology Division of GTRI, which includes the Agricultural Technology Research Program (ATRP) and Georgia’s Traditional Industries Program for Food Processing. It opened on March 1, 2005, and was dedicated on May 19, 2005.

Facilities
The Food Processing Technology Building contains over 36,000 square feet of office and laboratory space, including a 4,370 square foot high-bay testing and fabrication space, a 16-by-24-foot climate-controlled experiment chamber, an indoor environmental pilot area, a full-service chemical wet laboratory, and a 48-seat auditorium. The building houses five research laboratories: an automation research laboratory, an electronics lab, a systems development and integration laboratory, an environmental laboratory, and an optics laboratory. The building's lower lobby area features an interactive exhibit about the role of technology in poultry and food processing.

References

Georgia Tech buildings and structures
2005 establishments in Georgia (U.S. state)
Education in Atlanta
Food processing